Frank Coe (October 1, 1851 – September 16, 1931) was an Old West cowboy, gunman , and member of the Lincoln County Regulators.

Early years
Benjamin Franklin Coe was born in West Virginia in October 1851.  In 1871 he ventured to New Mexico Territory with his cousin, George Coe, where they worked on the ranch of another cousin. For a time they lived near Raton, New Mexico.  In July, 1876, Coe and Ab Saunders tracked down and killed outlaw Nicas Meras in the Baca Canyon due to Meras' rustling of cattle.  On July 18, 1876, both the Coe cousins, along with Doc Scurlock, Charlie Bowdre, and Saunders, broke into the Lincoln jail and grabbed an alleged horse thief, Jesus Largo, from Sheriff Saturnino Baco.  They took Largo outside of town and hanged him.

Lincoln County War

When the Lincoln County War broke out, Coe sided with the Alexander McSween faction, facing off against Sheriff William J. Brady, and the hired gunmen from the Evans and the Kinney gangs.  This followed the murder of a merchant, John Tunstall, which sparked the conflict.

Coe was present in the Gunfight of Blazer's Mills in which Buckshot Roberts was killed by the Regulators.  It is reported that he had attempted to convince Roberts to surrender before the shooting started. His cousin George supposedly fired the fatal shot, although that is disputed.  Fellow Regulators Charlie Bowdre, John Middleton, William H. "Billy the Kid" Bonney, and Scurlock were wounded in the shootout, while their leader, Dick Brewer, was killed.

Arrest
Frank Coe was captured on April 29, 1878, by a posse led by Evans, that included members of both the Evans gang and the Seven Rivers Warriors.  During the capture, Regulator Frank McNab was killed, and Saunders was badly wounded. Coe escaped sometime prior to the Battle of Lincoln which occurred in July of that year.

Later Years
After the Lincoln County War ended Coe left New Mexico, living for a time in Colorado and Nebraska.  He returned in 1884, and bought a ranch where he lived the remainder of his life. Between his departure and return he had been arrested in Santa Fe, New Mexico for the murder of Roberts.  It was determined, however, that he had been mistaken for his cousin George. In 1880 he was suspected of taking part in another lynching, but was never charged.  He and his wife, Helena Anne Tully, lived together for fifty years and raised six children.

1898 Murder Charge
In October 1898, Frank Coe shot and killed Irvine Lesnet, who was dating Coe's 16-year-old daughter, Sydney (1882-1955).  After about 18 months of court proceedings and trials, Coe was acquitted of the murder charge.

Death
Coe died September 16, 1931, in Lincoln County.

References

External links
A Loyal Regulator
The Battle of Lincoln

1851 births
1931 deaths
Cowboys
Gunslingers of the American Old West
Outlaws of the American Old West
People of the New Mexico Territory
Lincoln County Wars
American vigilantes
Place of birth unknown